Patrick Tauziac (born 18 January 1955, in Saigon, Vietnam) is a French former rally driver. Tauziac competed in the Rallye Côte d'Ivoire nine times as a World Rally Championship event, winning it in 1990.

Career
Born in Saigon, Tauziac left Vietnam at the age of two to spend his entire childhood in Madagascar. At the age of 20 he went to France for four years before moving to the Côte d'Ivoire.

After getting into rallying, Tauziac first entered the country's World Rally Championship round in 1984, and finished sixth in a Mitsubishi Colt. As the rally was only a round of the World Drivers' Championship and not the Manufacturers' Championship, it was not well supported by the factory teams. Tauziac finished the rally third in 1988 and second in 1989 before winning it in 1990.

WRC victories
{|class="wikitable"
! # 
!Event
!Season
!Co-driver
!Car
|-
|1
| 22ème Rallye Côte d'Ivoire
|1990
|Claude Papin
|Mitsubishi Galant VR-4
|}

References

External links
Profile at World Rally Archive
Profile at RallyBase
Patrick Tauziac Instagram
https://www.ewrc-results.com/profile/8169-patrick-tauziac/
https://www.juwra.com/tauziac_patrick.html
https://motorsportstats.com/driver/patrick-tauziac/summary/series/world-rally-championship

Living people
1955 births
Sportspeople from Ho Chi Minh City
French rally drivers
World Rally Championship drivers